Animato may refer to:

Animato, a compilation of short films by Mike Jittlov
Animato!, a now defunct magazine dedicated to animation
Animato (album), a 1990 album by John Abercrombie
Animato (music), a musical term

See also
Animator (disambiguation)